Hafiz Muhammad Siddique (1819-1890; , title 'Hafiz-ul-milat'), was an Islamic scholar and a Sufi of the Qadiriyya order from Sindh and founder of school of Bharchundi Shareef Khanqah in Sindh.

Bharchundi Shareef 

Siddique laid the foundation of Khanqah BharChundi Sharif as a spiritual centre. Khanqah BharChundi Sharif is situated 3 km in north of Daharki city which is a Tehsil of Ghotki district, Sindh Province. 

Aged 74, he died on 22 January 1890.

See also
 Ghulam Muhammad Din Puri

References 

Writers in British India
Sindhi people
19th-century Indian scholars
1890 deaths
1819 births